Actinopeltis is a genus of fungi in the Trichothyriaceae family.

Species
As accepted by Species Fungorum;

 Actinopeltis acicola 
 Actinopeltis ciliaris 
 Actinopeltis echinata 
 Actinopeltis englerulae 
 Actinopeltis hysterostomellae 
 Actinopeltis nitida 
 Actinopeltis philodendri 
 Actinopeltis scitula 
 Actinopeltis sordidula 

Former species;
 A. adianti  = Chaetothyriopsis adianti, Trichothyriaceae
 A. funtumiae  = Treubiomyces funtumiae, Chaetothyriaceae
 A. palustris  = Lichenopeltella palustris Microthyriaceae
 A. peltigericola  = Lichenopeltella peltigericola, Microthyriaceae
 A. peristomalis  = Trichothyrium peristomale, Trichothyriaceae

References

External links
Index Fungorum

Microthyriales